The Chicago State Cougars men's soccer program represents the Chicago State University in all NCAA Division I men's college soccer competitions. The Cougars soccer team began play in NCAA Division I in the 2020–21 season and the Western Athletic Conference in the 2021 season. As of 2022, CSU plays as in the Mid-American Conference as a men's soccer affiliate.  The Cougars play their home matches at SeatGeek Stadium in Bridgeview, Illinois. Norris Howze is the current head coach.

History
Chicago State University announced on June 23, 2020, that it would finally begin a men's soccer team, effective immediately. This fulfilled the school's commitment to add the sport when joining the Western Athletic Conference in 2014. CSU had later budgeted for a team in 2016, but the school did not then begin play due to financial challenges and seriously discussed leaving Division I. The decision to finally add men's soccer came at the same time the school dropped baseball due to fallout from the COVID-19 pandemic. The Cougars were to play in their full-time home of the WAC, but will not begin conference play until 2021. but the school announced that it would depart the WAC in June 2022.  The team's first head coach, Trevor Banks, stepped down on February 25, 2022. On May 27, 2022, the Cougars announced they would move their soccer program to the Mid-American Conference and play as an affiliate member in that sport only. On June 15, 2022, former assistant coach Norris Howze was announced as the new head coach.

Seasons

References

External links 
Official CSU website
Chicago State University Athletics website

 
Association football clubs established in 2020
2020 establishments in Illinois